The men's 1500 metres competition at the 2006 Asian Games in Doha, Qatar was held on 8 and 10 December 2006 at the Khalifa International Stadium.

Schedule
All times are Arabia Standard Time (UTC+03:00)

Records

Results 
Legend
DNF — Did not finish

1st round 
 Qualification: First 4 in each heat (Q) and the next 4 fastest (q) advance to the final.

Heat 1

Heat 2

Final

References

External links 
Results – 1st Round Heat 1
Results – 1st Round Heat 2

Athletics at the 2006 Asian Games
2006